Love Goes On may refer to:

Albums
Love Goes On (Dreams Come True album) or the title song, 1989
Love Goes On (Paulette Carlson album) or the title song, 1991
Love Goes On, by Andrea Zonn, 2003
Love Goes On, by Nana Mouskouri, 1976

Songs
"Love Goes On" (song), by the Go-Betweens, 1989
"Love Goes On", by Hannah Diamond from Reflections, 2019
"Love Goes On", by Jon English from It's All a Game, 1974

See also
"And Love Goes On", a song by Earth, Wind & Fire, 1981
 "Love Goes On and On", a song by Lindsey Stirling from Artemis, 2019